D518 is a state road connecting the Osijek bypass and the Vinkovci bypass.

The road, as well as all other state roads in Croatia, is managed and maintained by Hrvatske ceste, state owned company.

Traffic volume 

Traffic is regularly counted and reported by Hrvatske ceste, operator of the road.

Road junctions and populated areas

Sources

External links
 

State roads in Croatia
Vukovar-Syrmia County
Osijek-Baranja County